Nirala is a 1950 Bollywood film directed by Devendra Mukherjee. It stars Dev Anand, Madhubala in lead roles, along with Mazhar Khan plays the main antagonist. Mumtaz Ali, Leela Mishra, Yakub play the supporting roles. It revolves around a doctor who unknowingly forces a girl, who is in love with him, to marry a king.

With profits of 6 million, the film was a commercial success, which lead Anand and Madhubala doing seven more films together. It is specially noted for its song "Mehfil Mein Jal Uthi Shama" (picturised on Madhubala, sung by Lata Mangeshkar).

Plot 
After studying abroad for several years, a young doctor Anand (Dev Anand) returns home to inherit ownership of a rural village. En route to the village he encounters a girl, Poonam (Madhubala) whose mother (Leela Mishra) needs treatment. He secures lodgings in their house. A romance blossoms, but the girl's impecunious gambler brother (Yakub) marries her off to King Sangram (Mazhar Khan) and the couple are parted. When Poonam falls ill, Anand as the doctor is called and their lives are imperiled by the King's suspicious sister leading to a melodramatic denouement. Many misunderstandings and tears follow with Poonam committing suicide just before Anand reaches her.

Cast
Dev Anand as Dr. Anand
Madhubala as Poonam
Mazhar Khan as Raja Sangram Singh
Mumtaz Ali as Rani
Yakub as Poonam's Brother
Leela Mishra as Poonam's Mother

Soundtrack
The music of Nirala was composed by C. Ramchandra. The film's director Pyarelal Santoshi also wrote the lyrics of the songs. Nirala's music was an instant hit among the audience; most popular tracks were "Mehfil Mein Jal Uthi Shama", "Aisi Mohabbat Se Hum Baaj Aaye" and "Mohabbat Meri Rang Laane Lagi".

Reception

Critical reception 
In the review written by Cineplot, Nirala was described as the "most exasperating and irritating picture". Further it was written that, "It has a story that mocks common sense and makes light of reason. There is no motivation, for the actions of its characters have been repeatedly told to us." However it praised Madhubala's performance and called her "good enough in her role".

Box office 
Despite negative reviews, Nirala was a box-office hit; its success played a crucial role in establishing Madhubala as a leading lady of the time.

References

External links
 

1950 films
1950s Hindi-language films
Indian black-and-white films